Dabou is a port town in southern Ivory Coast. It is the seat of both the Lagunes District and the Grands-Ponts Region. It is also the seat of and a sub-prefecture of the Dabou Department. Dabou is also a commune. 

The town is served by Dabou Airport. Writer Regina Yaou was born in the town.

In 2021, the population of the sub-prefecture of Dabou was 138,083.

Villages
The sixteen villages of the sub-prefecture of Dabou and their population in 2014 are:

References

Sub-prefectures of Grands-Ponts
District capitals of Ivory Coast
Communes of Grands-Ponts
cvv
Regional capitals of Ivory Coast